KXOK-LP was a community-aimed Urban Contemporary LPFM radio station serving Modesto, California, broadcasting on 107.9 FM.

Originally licensed as KPSR-LP, it was Modesto's only true Urban formatted radio station playing Hip Hop, R&B, Old School, Classic soul and Gospel music, catering to the mainstream and adult audiences in the relatively demographically small African American community. (KHTN also plays Hip Hop and R&B, but it carries a Rhythmic format.)  In addition, it carried community affairs programs and had planned to air local church services.

KPSR-LP filed with the Federal Communications Commission (FCC) on February 7, 2014, for a Special Temporary Authorization (STA) allowing it to go off the air due to difficulty with the landlord of their studio in Modesto. A subsequent attempt by several local business people to revive the station as KXOK-LP, playing Oldies But Goodies music (as part of Modesto's annual "Graffiti Festival" program) was rejected by the FCC.

The station's call letters were removed from the FCC database on January 11, 2015, after the station was unable to provide proof that they had not been off-air for over a year.  A subsequent request to reverse the call-letter removal (and license cancellation) was rejected by the FCC on June 30, 2016.

References

External links
 
 KPSR-LP 107.9 FM Aircheck (December 2014)

XOK-LP
Urban contemporary radio stations in the United States
XOK-LP
Radio stations established in 2005
Radio stations disestablished in 2016
Defunct radio stations in the United States
Defunct community radio stations in the United States
2005 establishments in California
2016 disestablishments in California
XOK-LP